UND or Und may refer to:

Und, Hungary, a village
Und, a 1999 play by Howard Barker
University of North Dakota, a public university in Grand Forks, North Dakota
University of Notre Dame, a Catholic university in South Bend, Indiana
Undetermined language, in ISO 639-3 language codes
And in several languages related to German

See also 

 VND